The mythological hero Hercules or Heracles appears in several comics.

 Hercules (DC Comics), a long-running DC Comics character
 Hercules (Marvel Comics), a Marvel Comics character
 Hercules, a trainee member of The Order
 Hercules, a Topps Comics series based on the character from Hercules: The Legendary Journeys
 Hercules, a comic book from Dell Comics adapting the 1958 film Hercules
 Hercules Unchained, a comic book from Dell Comics adapting the 1959 film Hercules Unchained
 Hercules: Adventures of the Man-God, a 1967–1969 comic book series from Charlton Comics
 Hercules (Radical Comics), a Radical Comics character who has appeared in two limited series
 Joe Hercules, a superhuman circus strongman from Quality Comics who debuted in Hit Comics #1 (July 1940)
 The Mighty Hercules, a comic book from Gold Key Comics based on the early 1960s animated series The Mighty Hercules
 Spiff and Hercules, a French comic book series about a dog and cat

See also
 Hercules (disambiguation)